Cancerillidae is a family of copepods belonging to the order Siphonostomatoida.

Genera:
 Cancerilla Dalyell, 1851
 Cancerillopsis Stephensen, 1933
 Microcancerilla Norman & Brady, 1909
 Ophiopsyllopsis Sebastian, 1968
 Ophiopsyllus Stock, Humes & Gooding, 1963
 Parartotrogus Scott & Scott, 1893
 Parophiopsyllus Humes & Hendler, 1972

References

Copepods